Rhopaliella is a genus of beetles in the family Cerambycidae, containing the following species:

 Rhopaliella bicolorata (Monné, 1989)
 Rhopaliella discicollis (Chevrolat, 1859)

References

Rhopalophorini